María Josefina Bayo Jiménez (born 28 May 1961 in Fitero) is a Spanish soprano. Bayo studied at the Conservatorio Navarro de Música Pablo Sarasate in Pamplona and the Hochschule für Musik Detmold.

References

External links
 
Streamopera.com/Marìa Bayo

Spanish operatic sopranos
1961 births
Living people
Musicians from Navarre
Hochschule für Musik Detmold alumni
20th-century Spanish women opera singers
21st-century Spanish women opera singers